Aluminium indium arsenide, also indium aluminium arsenide or AlInAs (AlxIn1−xAs), is a semiconductor material with very nearly the same lattice constant as GaInAs, but a larger bandgap. The x in the formula above is a number between 0 and 1 - this indicates an arbitrary alloy between InAs and AlAs.

The formula AlInAs should be considered an abbreviated form of the above, rather than any particular ratio.

Aluminium indium arsenide is used e.g. as a buffer layer in metamorphic HEMT transistors, where it serves to adjust the lattice constant differences between the GaAs substrate and the GaInAs channel. It can be also used to form alternate layers with indium gallium arsenide, which act as quantum wells; these structures are used in e.g. broadband quantum cascade lasers.

Safety and toxicity aspects
The toxicology of AlInAs has not been fully investigated. The dust is an irritant to skin, eyes and lungs. The environment, health and safety aspects of aluminium indium arsenide sources (such as trimethylindium and arsine) and industrial hygiene monitoring studies of standard MOVPE sources have been reported recently in a review.

References

III-V semiconductors
III-V compounds
Arsenides
Aluminium compounds
Indium compounds
Zincblende crystal structure